Membertou 28B is a Mi'kmaq reserve located in Cape Breton County, Nova Scotia.

It is administratively part of the Membertou First Nation.

Indian reserves in Nova Scotia
Communities in Cape Breton County
Mi'kmaq in Canada